McKenzie Browne (born September 12, 1995) is an American speed skater.

Early life
Browne began her career as an inline speed skater at Bethlehem Skateaway in 2003 and has won 13 national titles. While in college, she competed in track cycling, and was named the 2015 Collegiate National Sprint Champion. At the 2016 USA Cycling National Track Championships she won a silver medal in the team sprint, and two bronze medals in the women's sprint and 500-meter time trial events.

She then transitioned to the ice when she saw several of her inline skating friends make the Olympic Team in 2018. Following her graduation in 2019, she moved to Salt Lake City, Utah to begin her speed skating career.

Speed skating career
Browne competed at the 2022 U.S. Olympic Trials in long-track speed skating. She placed sixth in the 500 metre and eighth in the 1000 metre, and failed to qualify for the Olympic team.

Browne represented the United States at the Four Continents Speed Skating Championships and won a gold medal in the team sprint. The team finished with a then American record time of 1:30.47.

On November 19, 2022, during the second event of the 2022–23 ISU Speed Skating World Cup, Browne won a bronze medal in the team sprint event with an American record time of 1:27.72. On December 17, 2022, during the fourth event of the 2022–23 ISU Speed Skating World Cup, Browne won a gold medal in the team sprint with an American record time of 1:25.68. She won the World Cup season title in the women's team sprint along with Kimi Goetz and Erin Jackson.

References

External links

1995 births
Living people
American female speed skaters
Sportspeople from Allentown, Pennsylvania
World Single Distances Speed Skating Championships medalists
21st-century American women